Rajya Sabha elections were held in 1980, to elect members of the Rajya Sabha, Indian Parliament's upper chamber.

Elections
Elections were held in 1980 to elect members from various states.
The list is incomplete.

Members elected
The following members are elected in the elections held in 1980. They are members for the term 1980-86 and retire in year 1986, except in case of the resignation or death before the term.

State - Member - Party

Bye-elections
The following bye elections were held in the year 1980.

State - Member - Party

 WB - Sangdopal Lepcha - CPM ( ele 11/03/1980 term till 1984 )
 HR - Hari Singh Nalwa - INC ( ele 19/03/1980 term till 1982 )
 Jammu & Kashmir - Sharief-ud-Din Shariq - JKNC ( ele 19/03/1980 term till 1984 )
 Karnataka  - B Ibrahim - INC ( ele 25/03/1980 term till 1984 )
 Punjab - Gurcharan Singh Tohra - SAD (  ele  09/05/1980 term till 1982 )
 MH - M C Bhandare - INC (  ele  30/06/1980 term till 1982 )
 UP - Dinesh Singh - OTH (  ele  30/06/1980 term till 1982 )
 UP - Narsingh Narain Pandey - OTH (  ele  30/06/1980 term till 1982 )
 MP - Rajendra Singh Ishwar Singh - OTH (  ele  30/06/1980 term till 1982 )
 Tamil Nadu - P Anbalagan - AIADMK ( ele  28/07/1980 term till 1984 )
 MH - N M Kamble - INC (  ele  04/08/1980 term till 1982 )
 Uttar Pradesh - P N Sukul - INC (  ele  05/07/1980 term till 1984 )

References

1980 elections in India
1980